Ward Christensen (born 1945 in West Bend, Wisconsin, United States) is the co-founder of the CBBS bulletin board, the first bulletin board system (BBS) ever brought online. Christensen, along with partner Randy Suess, members of the Chicago Area Computer Hobbyists' Exchange (CACHE), started development during a blizzard in Chicago, Illinois, and officially established CBBS four weeks later, on February 16, 1978. CACHE members frequently shared programs and had long been discussing some form of file transfer, and the two used the downtime during the blizzard to implement it.

Christensen was noted for building software tools for his needs. He wrote a cassette-based operating system before floppies and hard disks were common. When he lost track of the source code for some programs, he wrote ReSource, an iterative disassembler for the Intel 8080, to help him regenerate the source code. When he needed to send files to Randy Suess he wrote XMODEM.

Jerry Pournelle wrote in 1983 of a collection of CP/M public-domain software that "probably 50 percent of the really good programs were written by Ward Christensen, a public benefactor." Christensen received two 1992 Dvorak Awards for Excellence in Telecommunications, one with Randy Suess for developing the first BBS, and a lifetime achievement award "for outstanding contributions to PC telecommunications." In 1993, he received the Pioneer Award from the Electronic Frontier Foundation.

Christensen worked at IBM from 1968 until his retirement in 2012.  His last position with IBM was field technical sales specialist.

In May 2005, Christensen and Suess were both featured in BBS: The Documentary.

References

External links
 

American computer programmers
IBM employees
Milton College alumni
People from West Bend, Wisconsin
Living people
1945 births